John Joseph "Jack" Coughlin (June 21, 1892 – June 21, 1969) was a Canadian ice hockey player. After several years as an amateur player he turned professional in 1916, joining the Toronto Blueshirts of the National Hockey Association (NHA). The NHA was replaced by the National Hockey League (NHL) in 1917 to 1920, and Coughlin joined the Toronto Arenas for one season, winning the Stanley Cup with them in 1918. He took a one-year hiatus and returned in 1919 to play briefly with the Quebec Bulldogs, Montreal Canadiens, and Hamilton Tigers before retiring in 1921, having played 26 pro games: 7 in the NHA and 19 in the NHL. He died in 1969 at Peterborough, Ontario.

Playing career
He was born in Douro, Ontario. Coughlin played amateur ice hockey starting in junior with Peterborough, Ontario in 1909–10. He played four seasons for Peterborough, including one final season in senior. He then played for Ingersoll, Ontario in intermediate hockey for a season, and a season for Portage Lake-Houghton, Michigan, both seasons as an amateur. He became a professional for the Toronto Blueshirts in 1916–17. When the NHL was formed in 1917–18, he played for the "temporary" Toronto franchise which went on to win the Stanley Cup, although he was released by Toronto before the playoffs. He bounced around the NHL for the next few seasons with the Quebec Bulldogs, Montreal Canadiens, and Hamilton Tigers. He attempted to return to amateur, but his bid to be reinstated as an amateur was denied by the Ontario Hockey Association in 1921.

Career statistics

Regular season and playoffs

Transactions
 January 10, 1917 –  Signed as a free agent by Toronto Blueshirts
 February 11, 1917 – Claimed by Ottawa in NHA dispersal draft of Toronto players
 June 1917 – Rights reverted to Toronto
 January 5, 1918 – Released by Toronto
 January 13, 1920 – Signed as a free agent by Quebec
 February 11, 1920 – Released by Quebec
 November 27, 1920 – Traded to Hamilton by Montreal Canadiens with Joe Matte and Goldie Prodgers for Harry Mummery, Jack Patrick McDonald and Dave Ritchie plus the loan of Billy Coutu for 1920-21

References

External links
 

1892 births
1969 deaths
Canadian ice hockey right wingers
Hamilton Tigers (ice hockey) players
Ice hockey people from Ontario
Montreal Canadiens players
People from Peterborough County
Quebec Bulldogs players
Toronto Arenas players
Toronto Blueshirts players